Kovvur mandal is one of the 19 mandals in East Godavari district of the Indian state of Andhra Pradesh. Its headquarters are located in the town of Kovvur. The mandal is bounded by Nidadavole, Chagallu, Devarapalle, Tallapaudi mandals and on the east by the Godavari River.

Demographics 

 Census of India, the mandal had a population of 108,445. The total population constitute, 53,392 males and 55,053 females —a sex ratio of 1031 females per 1000 males. 10,633 children are in the age group of 0–6 years, of which 5,312 are boys and 5,321 are girls. The effective literacy rate stands at 76.33% with 74,659 literates.

Governance 

Kovvur mandal is one of the 3 mandals under Kovvur (SC) (Assembly constituency), which in turn represents Rajahmundry (Lok Sabha constituency) of Andhra Pradesh.

Towns and villages 

 census, the mandal has 17 settlements. It includes 1 town and 16 villages. Kovvur (M) is the only town in the mandal.

The settlements in the mandal are listed below:

Note: M-Municipality, †–Mandal headquarters

See also 
 List of mandals in Andhra Pradesh

References 

Mandals in East Godavari district